Tsisana Tatishvili (1939–2017) was a Georgian operatic soprano and educator who performed at the Tbilisi Opera from 1963 to 2000. People's Artist of the USSR. She also sang at the Bolshoi Theatre in Moscow and at the Komische Oper in Berlin. Her roles included Desdemona in Otello, Ortuda in Lohengrin and the title roles in Tosca and Salome. On retiring from the stage, she was active as a voice teacher.

Biography
Born in Tbilisi on 30 December 1937, Tatishvili studied voice at the State Conservatory under Gulnara Kartvelishvili, graduating in 1963. Until 2000, she was a soloist at the Tbilisi Opera and Ballet Theatre but also performed abroad, especially in Moscow and Berlin. As a concert performer, she sang the Ode to Joy in Beethoven's 9th Symphony and Verdi's Requiem as well as works by the Georgian composers Otar Taktakishvili and Aleksandre Machavariani.

Operatic roles included Maro in Zacharia Paliashvili's Daisi, Tamar in Taktakishvili's The Abduction of the Moon, Liza in Tchaikovsky's The Queen of Spades, Desdemona in Otello, Ortuda in Lohengrin, Santuzza in Mascagni's Cavalleria rusticana and the title roles in Tosca, Eboli (Don Carlo), Amneris (Aida) and Salome. On retiring from the stage, she became a voice teacher and served on committees promoting opera in Georgia.

Awards
A Fellow of the Georgian Academy, Tatishvili was honoured with many awards, including the Presidential Order of Excellence (1979) and the Georgian Order of Honour (2012).

References

1937 births
2017 deaths
Burials at Didube Pantheon
Actors from Tbilisi
Operatic sopranos from Georgia (country)
Soviet sopranos
20th-century women opera singers from Georgia (country)
Soviet music educators
Recipients of the Order of Honor (Georgia)
Recipients of the Presidential Order of Excellence
People's Artists of the USSR
Tbilisi State Conservatoire alumni
Soviet classical musicians
Classical musicians from Georgia (country)